Baker Island is an uninhabited atoll just north of the equator in the central Pacific Ocean.

Baker Island may also refer to:

 Baker Island (Alaska), an island in the Alexander Archipelago of southeastern Alaska, US
 Baker Island (British Columbia), an island in the Broughton Archipelago, Canada
 Baker Island (Maine), an island in the Town of Cranberry Isles, Maine, US
 Baker Island (Pennsylvania), an alluvial island in Forest County, Pennsylvania, US
 Baker Island (West Virginia), a former island on the Ohio River in Hancock County, West Virginia, US
 Baker Island in McDougall Sound, Qikiqtaaluk, Nunavut, Canada

See also
 Bakers Island, a private residential island in Massachusetts Bay, in Salem, Massachusetts, US
 Baker's Island, an island in Langstone Harbour, Hampshire, England